Daniel Coe (8 September 1941 – 19 October 1981) was a Romanian football defender. He was part of the Romanian team that reached quarterfinals at the 1964 Summer Olympics, and later participated at the 1970 World Cup.

Club career

Originating from an ethnic Aromanian family, Dan Coe, nicknamed Ministrul Apărării ("The Minister of Defence"), was born on 8 September 1941 in Bucharest and started playing football in 1956 at the junior squads of Rapid București, making his Divizia A debut on 18 March 1962 in a 1–1 against Minerul Lupeni. He remained with Rapid for ten seasons, being for a while the team's captain, winning the league title in the 1966–67 season, being used by coach Valentin Stănescu in 26 matches. He also played 4 games in the 1967–68 European Cup, four in the Inter-Cities Fairs Cup and won two Balkans Cup with Rapid. In 1971 he managed to earn a transfer in Belgium at Royal Antwerp, being one of the few Romanian footballers that was allowed by the communist regime to play in Western Europe. After two years in which he played 38 games and scored 8 goals in the Belgian First Division, he came back to Romania, playing for Divizia B club, FC Galaţi, helping the club earn promotion to Divizia A, where in the following season on 8 December 1974 he made his last appearance in the competition in a 6–0 loss in front of Universitatea Craiova, having a total of 214 Divizia A matches played with 12 goals scored.

International career

Dan Coe played 29 games in which he was captain 6 times and scored two goals at international level for Romania, making his debut on 12 May 1963 when coach Silviu Ploeșteanu sent him on the field in the 30th minute in order to replace Ion Nunweiller in a friendly which ended with a 3–2 victory against East Germany. He played 6 games in which he scored one goal in a 3–1 away loss against Czechoslovakia at the 1966 World Cup qualifiers and made three appearances at the Euro 1968 qualifiers. Coe also played four games at the successful 1970 World Cup qualifiers, having a appreciated performance in front of Eusébio in Romania's 1–0 home victory against Portugal, being selected by coach Angelo Niculescu to be part of the squad from the final tournament, however without playing a single match. Dan Coe played his last game for the national team on 16 May 1971 in a 1–0 loss against Czechoslovakia at the Euro 1972 qualifiers. He also played for Romania's Olympic team and participated at the 1964 Summer Olympics in Tokyo where he made four appearances, helping the team finish in the 5th place.

International goals
Scores and results list Romania's goal tally first. "Score" column indicates the score after each Dan Coe goal.

Personal life
Dan Coe was of Aromanian ethnicity and his father, Duce Coe was also a footballer and captain of Sportul Studențesc București and also an Iron Guard legionnaire.

Death
After he ended his playing career, he obtained permission from the communist regime to go on a trip in Belgium, but after he arrived there he settled in Cologne, West Germany as a political refugee. Shortly after an interview on Radio Free Europe in which he criticized Romania's communist regime, Coe was found dead in his apartment on 19 October 1981. His wife and his daughter found him hanged by the door handle with a rope around his neck and with his knees close to his mouth. The criminologist that investigated the case told them that he had never seen someone hang himself in such a way, therefore he recorded it as a suspicious death and it was subsequently believed that he was killed at the behest of the Romanian Securitate, but this has never been proven, his friend and fellow Romanian political refugee, Nora Nagy saying years later to the press:"I don't remember what Dan said at Free Europe. Anyway, once I got here I didn't pay that much attention to the station's broadcasts, but Dan was outspoken and always spoke his mind. However, I noticed one thing. After the collaboration with Free Europe began, all sorts of dubious characters began to appear around him. I suspected many of them to have connections with the Securitate".

Honours
Rapid București
Divizia A: 1966–67
Balkans Cup: 1963–64, 1964–66

Notes

References

External links

Dan Coe at Rafcmuseum.be 

1941 births
1981 deaths
Footballers from Bucharest
Romanian people of Aromanian descent
Aromanian sportspeople
Romanian footballers
Romania international footballers
Romanian expatriate footballers
Romanian defectors
Liga I players
Liga II players
FC Rapid București players
Royal Antwerp F.C. players
FCM Dunărea Galați players
Olympic footballers of Romania
Footballers at the 1964 Summer Olympics
1970 FIFA World Cup players
Expatriate footballers in Belgium
Romanian expatriate sportspeople in Belgium
Belgian Pro League players
Association football defenders
Suicides by hanging in Germany
Romanian emigrants to West Germany